Juan Carlos Corazzo  (14 December 1907 – 12 January 1986) was a Uruguayan football player and manager.

Career
Corazzo played for Argentine club Independiente in the 1930s.

Corazzo later coached Uruguay at the 1962 FIFA World Cup.

Corazzo held the Uruguay national football team record for most consecutive games without loss from 1967 to 1968 (14 games), until Óscar Tabárez surpassed it with 18 consecutive games between 2011 and 2012.

Personal life
He is the grandfather of Diego Forlán and father-in-law of Pablo Forlán.

References

1907 births
1986 deaths
Uruguayan footballers
Uruguayan expatriate footballers
Club Atlético Independiente footballers
Uruguayan football managers
Uruguay national football team managers
Argentine Primera División players
Expatriate footballers in Argentina
1962 FIFA World Cup managers
Uruguayan people of Italian descent
Association football midfielders
Danubio F.C. managers